Gheorghe Cristoloveanu (16 April 1931 – 1998) was a Romanian alpine skier. He competed in three events at the 1956 Winter Olympics.

References

1931 births
1998 deaths
Romanian male alpine skiers
Olympic alpine skiers of Romania
Alpine skiers at the 1956 Winter Olympics
Sportspeople from Brașov